Altzayanca Municipality is a municipality in Tlaxcala in south-eastern Mexico.

References

External links

Municipalities of Tlaxcala